South Manheim Township is a township in Schuylkill County, Pennsylvania, United States. The population was 2,751 at the 2020 census. It was created in 1845 by dividing Manheim Township into South Manheim and North Manheim Townships.

Geography
According to the U.S. Census Bureau, the township has a total area of 21.0 square miles (54.3 km), of which 20.6 square miles (53.3 km)  is land and 0.4 square mile (1.0 km)  (1.77%) is water.

Demographics

At the 2000 census there were 2,191 people, 796 households, and 643 families living in the township.  The population density was 106.4 people per square mile (41.1/km).  There were 966 housing units at an average density of 46.9/sq mi (18.1/km).  The racial makeup of the township was 98.31% White, 0.46% African American, 0.23% Asian, 0.37% from other races, and 0.64% from two or more races. Hispanic or Latino of any race were 0.68%.

Of the 796 households 35.6% had children under the age of 18 living with them, 74.0% were married couples living together, 5.0% had a female householder with no husband present, and 19.2% were non-families. 14.9% of households were one person and 6.3% were one person aged 65 or older.  The average household size was 2.75 and the average family size was 3.07.

The age distribution was 25.9% under the age of 18, 5.3% from 18 to 24, 29.8% from 25 to 44, 25.8% from 45 to 64, and 13.1% 65 or older.  The median age was 39 years. For every 100 females, there were 97.6 males.  For every 100 females age 18 and over, there were 97.9 males.

The median household income was $46,786 and the median family income  was $49,757. Males had a median income of $37,629 versus $26,375 for females. The per capita income for the township was $19,638.  About 2.0% of families and 3.0% of the population were below the poverty line, including 2.2% of those under age 18 and 4.5% of those age 65 or over.

References

Townships in Schuylkill County, Pennsylvania
Townships in Pennsylvania